Zabrdje may refer to: 

Zabrđe (Ugljevik), a village in the Municipality of Ugljevik, Bosnia and Herzegovina
Zabrdje, Mirna, a settlement in the Municipality of Mirna, southeastern Slovenia